CRLX101 is a experimental approach to cancer chemotherapy that is under investigation in human trials. It is an example of a nanomedicine.

The agent represents a nanoparticle conjugate that consists of a drug delivery molecule, namely a cyclodextrin-based polymer (CDP) and an anti-cancer compound (camptothecin). It was developed by Mark E. Davis, professor of Chemical Engineering at the California Institute of Technology, and associates at Insert Therapeutics, Inc., now Calando Pharmaceuticals, Inc., hence the original name "IT-101". Its novel delivery mode allows the agent, and thus the toxic anti-cancer component, to be preferentially accumulated in cancer tissue. In turn, toxic side effect are expected to be reduced. The technology was licensed by Calando and Caltech to Cerulean Pharma, in 2009.

Rationale
Camptothecin (CPT), an alkaloid extract with poor water solubility from plants such as Camptotheca acuminata, exhibits anti-cancer activity possibly due, at least in part, by the inhibition of DNA topoisomerase I resulting in cell death. In CRLX101, CPT is linked covalently through a glycine link to the linear copolymer CDP, which in turn consists of alternating subunits of beta-cyclodextrin and polyethylene glycol (PEG). The CRLX101 nanoparticle is water-soluble. After intravenous injection, active CPT is slowly released as the linkage is hydrolyzed. The size of the nanoparticle (20-50 nm in diameter) facilitates its extravasation in the more leaky vessels of tumors via the enhanced permeability and retention effect and as a result, the anticancer drug is enhanced and retained in the tumor tissue.

Clinical trials
The Phase 1/2a clinical trial was conducted at the City of Hope National Medical Center, the Translational Genomics Research Institute, and San Juan Oncology Associates.

Alternate drug name
CRLX101 was originally named IT-101 and was changed to CRLX101 after licensing to Cerulean Pharma Inc. CRLX101 is the official name in clinical trials.

Media
IT-101 and Mark E. Davis were included in a PBS documentary titled Survival.

References

External links
 Calando Pharmaceuticals, Inc. was Insert Therapeutics, Inc.
 Cerulean Pharma Inc. CRLX101 licensee and current developer
 Q&A with Mark Davis on Thirteen
 Mark E. Davis Research Group at California Institute of Technology

Experimental cancer drugs